Gravitcornutia bertioga is a species of moth of the family Tortricidae. It is found in São Paulo, Brazil.

The wingspan is 9 mm. The ground colour of the forewings is yellowish cream. The markings are yellow brown with browner edges. The hindwings are pale brownish cream.

Etymology
The species name refers to the type locality, Bertioga.

References

Moths described in 2010
Gravitcornutia
Moths of South America
Taxa named by Józef Razowski